Stede Broec is a municipality in the Netherlands, in the province of North Holland and the region of West-Frisia. The name Stede Broec derives from stede (meaning city) and broec (meaning swamp).

Population centres 

The municipality of Stede Broec consists of the following cities, towns, villages and/or districts:

Topography 

Dutch topographic map of the municipality of Stede Broec, June 2015

History 

Grootebroek and Bovenkarspel together received city rights in 1364, under the name of Broek. In 1402 Lutjebroek shared in the city rights and Hoogkarspel joined in 1403. Andijk was the fifth to join in 1786. In 1825 the city was dissociated.

Stede Broec is located in the region of West Friesland consisting of all the land surrounded by the Westfriese Omringdijk, a dike which then protected the land against the dangers of the tides of the Zuider Zee.

Local government 

The municipal council of Stede Broec consists of 19 seats, which are divided as follows (as of March 3, 2010):

Notable people 
 Johannes Willebrands (1909 in Bovenkarspel – 2006) a Dutch Cardinal of the Roman Catholic Church
 Trudy van den Berg (born 1947 in Grootebroek) singer with Dutch vocal duo Saskia & Serge
 Ed Groot (born 1957 in Grootebroek) a Dutch politician and former journalist, columnist and civil servant
 Ria Brieffies (1957 in Lutjebroek - 2009) a Dutch singer with girl group Dolly Dots
 Nina Buysman (born 1997 in Bovenkarspel) a Dutch racing cyclist

Gallery

References

External links

Official website

 
Municipalities of North Holland